Émile Joly (22 April 1904 – 24 February 1980) was a Belgian racing cyclist. He rode in the 1929 Tour de France.

References

1904 births
1980 deaths
Belgian male cyclists
Place of birth missing